Porges-Meier reaction is a precipitation test used in the diagnosis of syphilis. It is an early flocculation test for syphilis.

Background
Precipitate formation takes place in a serum by the addition of a solution of sodium glycocholate. This reaction, according to Otto Porges, only occurs in syphilis.

References

Medical tests